Sashimi bōchō, literally "sashimi knife" is a type of long, thin knife used in Japanese cuisine to prepare sashimi (sliced raw fish or other seafood).

Similar to the nakiri bōchō, the style differs slightly between Tokyo and Osaka. In Osaka, the yanagi ba has a pointed end, whereas in Tokyo the tako hiki has a rectangular end. The tako hiki is usually used to prepare octopus. A fugu hiki is similar to the yanagi ba, except that the blade is thinner and more flexible. As the name indicates, the fugu hiki is traditionally used to slice very thin fugu sashimi and is stored separately from the other knives.

The length of the knife is suitable to fillet medium-sized fish. Specialized knives exist for processing longer fish, such as tuna. Such knives include the almost two-meter-long oroshi hōchō, or the slightly shorter hancho hōchō.

See also
Japanese cutlery
List of Japanese cooking utensils
Kitchen knife
Santoku
Chef's knife

Japanese kitchen knives